Pierre Lalonde (January 20, 1941 – June 21, 2016) was a Canadian singer and television host.

The son of Jean Lalonde, a popular singer in the 1940s, Lalonde attended high school in the United States but returned to Canada in 1960, where he worked at radio station CKJL with his father in Saint-Jérôme, Quebec. Shortly after, he worked in Montreal at CJMS.

In 1961, Lalonde moved to television station CFTM-TV to host a variety of programs, including the popular show Jeunesse d'aujourd'hui (Today's Youth). The following year he released his first single and made his first LP in 1963. Lalonde mainly recorded in French, but he released a number of singles in English as well.

Lalonde's success led to his own program, The Peter Martin Show, on WPIX in New York from 1967 to 1968. He also recorded one album, Introducing Peter Martin, under this name. His English-language shows included Music Hop, The Mad Dash, Circus and The Pierre Lalonde Show. He emceed the Telethon of Stars in the 1970s and 1980s. In 1983 and 1984 he hosted the Miss Teen Canada Pageant.

Pierre Lalonde received Quebec's Medal of Honour of the National Assembly in 2011 for his artistic contributions.

Death
Lalonde died on June 21, 2016 in Hudson, Quebec at the age of 75, due to complications from Parkinson's disease.

Discography
Pierre Lalonde's Discography

Filmography
Pierre Lalonde's Filmography

References

External links

 
 Pierre Lalonde at Discogs
 Pierre Lalonde discography at Rétro Jeunesse 60
 Article at thecanadianencyclopedia.ca

1941 births
2016 deaths
Canadian game show hosts
French Quebecers
Canadian male singers
Singers from Montreal
Apex Records artists
Capitol Records artists
French-language singers of Canada
Beauty pageant hosts
Deaths from dementia in Canada
Deaths from Parkinson's disease
Deaths from Lewy body dementia